A hotel manager, hotelier, or lodging manager is a person who manages the operation of a hotel, motel, resort, or other lodging-related establishment. Management of a hotel operation includes, but is not limited to management of hotel staff, business management, upkeep and sanitary standards of hotel facilities, guest satisfaction and customer service, marketing management, sales management, revenue management, financial accounting, purchasing, and other functions. The title "hotel manager" or "hotelier" often refers to the hotel's General Manager who serves as a hotel's head executive, though their duties and responsibilities vary depending on the hotel's size, purpose, and expectations from ownership. The hotel's General Manager is often supported by subordinate department managers that are responsible for individual departments and key functions of the hotel operation.

Hotel management structure
The size and complexity of a hotel management organizational structure varies significantly depending on the size, features, and function of the hotel or resort. A small hotel operation normally may consist of a small core management team consisting of a Hotel Manager and a few key department supervisors who directly handle day-to-day operations. On the other hand, a large full-service hotel or resort complex often operates more similarly to a large corporation with an executive board headed by the General Manager and consisting of key directors serving as heads of individual hotel departments. Each department at the large hotel or resort complex may normally consist of subordinate line-level managers and supervisors who handle day-to-day operations.

Example of Large/Full Service Hotel or Resort Complex
A typical organizational chart for a large resort hotel operation may often resemble the following:

General Manager reports to a Regional Vice President and/or Ownership/Investors
 General Manager or Managing Director
 Assistant General Manager or Resident Manager
 Director of Operations or Rooms Division
 Director of Front Office or Front Office Manager
 Front Desk Manager (Shift Manager)
 Bell Captain 
 Chief Concierge
 Valet Captain or Parking Manager
 PBX/Communications Manager
 Overnight Manager or Head Night Auditor
 Director of Housekeeping or Executive Housekeeper
 Assistant Director of Housekeeping or Executive Housekeeper 
 Floor Manager (Shift Manager)
 Laundry Manager
 Director of Revenue Management or Revenue Manager
 Reservations Manager
 Director of Sales & Marketing
 Senior Sales Manager
 Leisure Sales Manager
 Business Travel Sales Manager
 Social Group Sales Manager
 Corporate Group Sales Manager
 Marketing Manager
 Social Media Manager
 Public Relations Manager
 Director of Food & Beverage
 Restaurant Manager
 Assistant Restaurant Manager
 Executive Chef
 Room Service Manager
 Butlers Manager
 Club Manager
 Bar & Lounge Manager
 Banquets Manager
 Director of Group and Events
 Assistant Director of Events
 Convention Services Manager
 Event Manager
 Catering Manager
 Director of Finance
 Accounting Manager
 Payroll Manager
 Purchasing Manager
 Director of Engineering
 Chief Engineer
 Maintenance Manager
 Facilities Manager
 Director of Human Resources
 Human Resources Manager
 Recruiting Manager
 Training Manager
 Labor Relations Manager (For Unionized Hotels)
 Chief of Security
 Recreation Manager
 Information Technology Manager

Additional Management Positions may exist for additional facilities such as hotel-owned golf courses, casinos, or spas.

Example for Small/Limited service hotel
A typical organizational chart for a small low-rise hotel operation may resemble the following:

Hotel Manager reports to Regional Director and/or Ownership/Investors
 General Manager
 Guest Service Manager (Front of House)
 Housekeeping Manager
 Chief Engineer
 Sales & Marketing Manager
 Food & Beverage Manager
 Account Manager
Administrative functions for a small-scale hotel such as Accounting, Payroll, and Human Resources may normally be handled by a centralized corporate office or solely by the Hotel Manager. Additional auxiliary functions such as security may be handled by third-party vendor services contracted by the hotel on an as-needed basis. Hotel management is necessary to implement standard operating procedures and actions as well as handling day-to-day operations.

Typical qualifications
The background and training required varies by the type of management position, size of operation, and duties involved. Industry experience has proven to be a basic qualification for nearly any management occupation within the lodging industry. A BS and a MS degree in Hospitality Management/or an equivalent Business degree is often strongly preferred by most employers in the industry but not always required.

A higher level graduate degree may be desired for a General Manager type position, but is often not required with sufficient management experience and industry tenure. A graduate degree may however be required for a higher level corporate executive position or above such as a Regional Vice President who oversees multiple hotel properties and General Managers.

Working conditions
Hotel managers are generally exposed to long shifts that include late hours, weekends, and holidays due to the 24-hour operation of a hotel. The common workplace environment in hotels is fast-paced, with high levels of interaction with guests, employees, investors, and other managers.

Upper management consisting of senior managers, department heads, and General Managers may sometimes enjoy a more desirable work schedule consisting of a more traditional business day with occasional weekends and holidays off.

Depending on the size of the hotel, a typical hotel manager's day may include assisting with operational duties, managing employee performance, handling dissatisfied guests, managing work schedules, purchasing supplies, interviewing potential job candidates, conducting physical walks and inspections of the hotel facilities and public areas, and additional duties.  These duties may vary each day depending on the needs of the property. The manager's responsibility also includes knowing about all current local events as well as the events being held on the hotel property.  Managers are often required to attend regular department meetings, management meetings, training seminars for professional development, and additional functions.  A hotel/casino property may require additional duties regarding special events being held on property for casino complimentary guests.

2020 coronavirus pandemic 
Working conditions were increasingly difficult during the 2020 coronavirus pandemic. One CEO of a major hotel owner, Monty Bennett of Ashford Inc., told CBS News that he had to lay off or furlough 95% of his 7,000 U.S. workers. By the second week of the major outbreak of the virus in the U.S., the industry asked Congress for $250 billion in bailouts for owners and employees because of financial setbacks and mass layoffs.

Salary expectations
The median annual wage in 2015 of the 48,400 lodging managers in the United States was $49,720.

See also

References

Hospitality management
Hospitality occupations
Management occupations
Managers